"Survival" is the thirteenth episode aired of the first series of UFO - a 1970 British television science fiction series about an alien invasion of Earth. The screenplay was written Tony Barwick and the director was Alan Perry. The episode was filmed between 30 June and 10 July 1970   and aired on the ATV Midlands on 30 December 1970. Though shown as the thirteenth episode, it was actually the fourth to have been filmed.

The series was created by Gerry Anderson and Sylvia Anderson with Reg Hill, and produced by the Andersons and Lew Grade's Century 21 Productions for Grade's ITC Entertainment company.

Story
Under the cover of a meteor shower, a UFO manages to evade SHADO's tracking and land on the moon. The alien pilot gets close enough to Moonbase to shoot out a window of the Leisure Sphere -the resulting explosive decompression kills an astronaut inside and almost kills Paul Foster.

Straker orders a search of the vicinity around Moonbase using moon mobiles and they locate the UFO in a crater. The UFO shoots at the moon mobiles whereupon the interceptors are called in. They shoot the UFO down as it tries to take off and it crashes into Foster's moon mobile. Thrown clear, Foster is injured in the explosion and his spacesuit's radio transmitter is broken. SHADO believes that he has been killed.

Foster is not alone, however, as the alien has also survived. The two adversaries realize that to survive they need to co-operate on the walk back to Moonbase. They get close to their destination but a search team locates Foster. Believing the alien to be a threat and with Foster unable to contact the search team due to his broken radio, they shoot and kill the alien.

Cast

Starring
 Ed Bishop — Commander Edward Straker
 George Sewell — Col. Alec E. Freeman
 Michael Billington — Col. Paul Foster
 Ayshea — Lt. Ayshea Johnson
 Dolores Mantez — Lt. Nina Barry
 Harry Baird — Lt. Mark Bradley

Featuring
 Suzan Farmer — Tina Duval	
 Robert Swann — Bill Grant	
 Gito Santana — Alien	
 Ray Armstrong — Rescuer
 David Weston — Rescuer

Production notes
Locations used for the filming included Neptune House at ATV Elstree Studios, Borehamwood; and Windermere Hall, London.

References

External links

1971 British television episodes
UFO (TV series) episodes